__NoToC__
Publius Vitellius, grandfather of the emperor Vitellius, was a Roman eques, who served as procurator during the reign of Augustus.

Family
Vitellius was born at Nuceria Apulorum, perhaps the son of the Quintus Vitellius who was a quaestor under Augustus.  His sister, Vitellia, married Aulus Plautius, consul suffectus in 1 BC.  He had four sons: Lucius, the father of the emperor, had a distinguished military career, and was consul in AD 34.  Publius was also a distinguished soldier, serving on the staff of Germanicus.  He was arrested following the downfall of Sejanus, and died in confinement.  Aulus was consul suffectus in AD 32, and died in office.  Quintus was a senator, whom the emperor deprived of his rank.

See also
 Vitellia gens

References

Bibliography
 Fasti Ostienses, .
 Publius Cornelius Tacitus, Annales.
 Gaius Suetonius Tranquillus, De Vita Caesarum (Lives of the Caesars, or The Twelve Caesars).

Vitellii
Roman quaestors
Ancient Roman equites
1st-century BC Romans